La tierra, is a Mexican telenovela produced by Ernesto Alonso for Televisa in 1973. Starring Claudia Islas and Ernesto Alonso.

Cast 
Claudia Islas as Lucía
Ernesto Alonso as Don Antonio
 as Hilario
Enrique Lizalde as Alvaro
Lucía Méndez as Olivia
Irma Serrano as Martina
Rita Macedo as Consuelo
José Alonso as Alberto
Rebeca Silva as  Blanca
Norma Lazareno as  Gabriela
Aarón Hernán as Nacho
Martha Zavaleta as Petra
Raquel Olmedo as Raymunda
Carmen Montejo as Cordelia
Héctor Sáez as Padre Juan
Eric del Castillo as Estrada
Ricardo Mondragón as Don Lupe
Roberto Antúnez as Marianito
José Antonio Ferral as Marcelo
Alfonso Meza as Alfonso
Arsenio Campos as Carlos
Gustavo Rojo
Jose Chavez Trowe as Reyes
Noe Murayama as Fernando
Kikis Herrera Calles as Rosaura
Oscar Morelli as Ornelas
Raul Mena as Jacinto
Armando Acosta as Odilon
Carlos Agosti as Rafael
Guillermo Zarur as Don Fermin
Miguel Manzano
Florinda Meza
César Bono
Pedro Regueiro
Victorio Blanco
Ponciano del Castillo

References

External links 

Mexican telenovelas
1973 telenovelas
Televisa telenovelas
Spanish-language telenovelas
1973 Mexican television series debuts
1973 Mexican television series endings